General Sir Charles John Burnett  (30 October 1843 – 10 November 1915) was a British Army officer at the end of the 19th century and during the early years of the 20th century.

Military career
Burnett was born in St Kilda, Victoria, the son of John Alexander Burnett. He was commissioned into the 15th Foot in 1861.  He participated in the Third Anglo-Ashanti War of 1873 to 1874, then attended and graduated from the Royal Military College, Sandhurst. He next saw active service in the Second Anglo-Afghan War of 1878 to 1880.

Burnett became assistant adjutant-general in Bombay in 1880 and commanding officer of the Royal Irish Rifles in 1887. He rose to be assistant adjutant-general at Aldershot in 1893. Promoted to major general in 1895, he became General Officer Commanding the Eastern District in 1896 before being posted to British India in 1898, where he was Commander of the Poona District by 1900. He was awarded the Kaisar-i-Hind Medal in the 1900 Birthday Honours. He was promoted to lieutenant general in 1905.

During the Russo-Japanese War of 1904 to 1905, he was the senior British military observer embedded within the Imperial Japanese Army in Manchuria from February to September 1905.

He served as General Officer Commanding-in-Chief of Western Command from 1907 to 1910.

He retired in 1910.

Notes

|-

References

British Army generals
East Yorkshire Regiment officers
Knights Commander of the Order of the Bath
Knights Commander of the Royal Victorian Order
Recipients of the Kaisar-i-Hind Medal
1915 deaths
1843 births
Graduates of the Royal Military College, Sandhurst
British military personnel of the Third Anglo-Ashanti War
British military personnel of the Second Anglo-Afghan War
People of the Russo-Japanese War